Timothy William "TW" Walsh (born January 26, 1975 in Melrose, Massachusetts, United States) is an American songwriter, multi-instrumentalist, record producer, mixing engineer and mastering engineer.

In August 2003, Walsh officially joined Pedro the Lion, led by David Bazan. He had been occasionally been playing live with the band and contributing to recordings since 2000. The two would also collaborate on Bazan's Headphones project. Walsh was, aside from Bazan, the only other official member of Pedro the Lion, and was heavily involved in the recording of Pedro the Lion's Achilles Heel. Citing personal and financial reasons, Walsh left both projects in late 2005, after which Bazan retired the Pedro the Lion moniker. In 2009 Walsh mixed and mastered Bazan's Curse Your Branches album, and has worked on several Bazan releases since.

After Pedro the Lion Walsh formed the Soft Drugs, featuring percussionist Jason Cammarata, bass player Ken Maiuri, guitar player Michael Murray, and guitar and keyboard player John Beck of Emergency Music. The band released two EPs, In Moderation (2006) and Get Back – Side A (2008). The nine songs from the two EPs were later reissued on a single album, The Soft Drugs, released in 2013.

Walsh has released six solo albums since 1999, and a handful of EPs and singles.

Walsh also provided musical, mastering and production assistance for other artists, including Sufjan Stevens—for whom he mastered All Delighted People, Planetarium, Carrie and Lowell Live and The Age of Adz—Starflyer 59, Ben Gibbard, Nathaniel Rateliff, Damien Jurado, Cold War Kids, Clap Your Hands Say Yeah, The Shins, Kristin Hersh, and nearly 1,000 others.

Walsh formed a new band called Lo Tom with longtime friends David Bazan, Jason Martin (of Starflyer 59), and Trey Many. They released their debut record on Barsuk in July 2017.

Discography

Albums 
 How We Spend Our Days (Made in Mexico, 1999)
 Blue Laws (Atavistic Records, 2001)
 Songs of Pain and Leisure (Graveface Records, 2011)
 Fruitless Research (Graveface, 2016)
 Terrible Freedom (Tower of Song, 2017)

EPs 
 Pollensongs (My Pal God Records, 2002)
 Daylight (2022)

With the Soft Drugs
 In Moderation (EP, 2006)
 Get Back - Side A (EP, 2008)
 The Soft Drugs (Tower of Song, 2013)

References

External links
 TW Walsh's Official Web Site

1975 births
Living people
American male singer-songwriters
American indie rock musicians
American audio engineers
My Pal God Records artists
Mixing engineers
Musicians from Boston
Record producers from Massachusetts
Pedro the Lion members
Headphones (band) members
21st-century American singers
21st-century American male singers
Atavistic Records artists
Singer-songwriters from Massachusetts